Kjell Aamot (born 7 November 1950) is a Norwegian business executive who chaired the Schibsted Media Group for twenty years.

Aamot is educated as economist from the BI Norwegian Business School. He has had administrative position in Verdens Gang, and served as CEO of Schibsted from 1989 to 2009.

References

1950 births
Living people
People from Trondheim
BI Norwegian Business School alumni
Norwegian economists
Norwegian businesspeople
Verdens Gang people